His or Her Majesty's Excise refers to 'inland' duties levied on articles at the time of their manufacture. Excise duty was first raised in England in 1643. Like HM Customs (a far older branch of the revenue services), the Excise was administered by a Board of Commissioners who were accountable to the Lords Commissioners of the Treasury. While 'HM Revenue of Excise' was a phrase used in early legislation to refer to this form of duty, the body tasked with its collection and general administration was usually known as the Excise Office.

In 1849 the Board of Excise was merged with the Board of Stamps and Taxes to form a new department: the Inland Revenue. Sixty years later the Excise department was demerged from the Inland Revenue and amalgamated with HM Customs to form HM Customs and Excise (which was itself amalgamated with the Inland Revenue in 2005 to create HM Revenue and Customs).

Organisation
Following the example of HM Customs, the Board of Excise set up a network of administrative areas called 'Collections' (each with its own Collector). Unlike HM Customs, the Excise operated inland as well as on the coast: initially it had 39 Collections in England (mostly corresponding with the English Counties) and 4 in Wales; later its remit was extended to cover Scotland and Ireland as well. The Collections were subdivided into Districts (each overseen by a Supervisor), which themselves had smaller subdivisions, known either as Rides (if covered by an Excise Officer on horseback) or Foot-walks (which were covered by an Excise Officer on foot).

Personnel

Each Excise Collector was required to tour his Collection eight times a year, visiting each Market Town in turn in order to hold 'sittings' and receive revenue payments. In the intervening time, locally based Excise Officers (known informally as excisemen or gaugers) would make regular visits to the manufacturers and retailers in order to assess the duty payable on relevant items and to issue 'vouchers' summarizing the duty owed. Meanwhile, the Supervisors would make regular spot-checks on the excisemen in their Districts and report any anomalies or errors in their accounts.

This pattern of work remained the norm through the 18th and 19th centuries. In the 1820s, an excise officer wrote a detailed description of his daily routine, spent visiting a series of different manufacturers and retailers: chandlers, brewers, innkeepers, tanners, maltsters, distillers and tea and tobacco merchants (with substantial amounts of administrative work to be done in the intervening moments). The excise officer carried various specialist items of equipment for testing and measuring different dutiable products; for example the Sikes hydrometer (invented by an officer of Excise, Benjamin Sikes, in the 18th century and used by Excise officers from 1816 until 1980 for measuring the alcohol proof of spirits).

Headquarters
Initially, in 1643, the Excise Office had a headquarters in Broad Street in the City of London. Thereafter, as it expanded, it leased successively larger properties in and around the City. Having returned to Broad Street in the 1670s, the Excise moved out again in the early 1700s, only to move back (into a new purpose-built headquarters there) in 1769. This new Excise Office in Broad Street was designed by George Dance the Elder and built on the site of Gresham College: it consisted of two ranges, one of stone, the other of brick, with a spacious courtyard laid out between the them. The Excise remained there until 1852, when its staff moved to join the other departments of the newly-formed Inland Revenue in Somerset House.

Excise licences
In order to be able to regulate and inspect the manufacture of dutiable products, the Excise Office issued licences to manufacturers (and it was then illegal for anyone to manufacture such items without a licence). Traders in some items were similarly licensed. In the late 18th century a duty was imposed on the licenses themselves: Excise Licence duty (the rate of which often varied depending on the scale of production) had to be paid in addition to any duty payable on the goods that were being manufactured or traded under licence.

History

17th century
On 22 July 1643, the Long Parliament passed the 'Excise Ordinance' (an Ordinance for the speedy raising and levying of moneys by way of charge or impost upon several commodities) to raise money for the maintenance of Parliamentary forces. The ordinance established a board of eight Commissioners to oversee the collection of this revenue. Duty was initially levied on beer, cider, spirits and soap, but the list of dutiable items grew year by year and before long excise duty was being levied on such day-to-day necessities as meat, fish, clothes and leather, prompting public resentment. (In 1647 the Excise office in Smithfield was burned to the ground during a riot against the Excise duty on meat.)

After the Restoration the Excise (which had begun as a temporary measure) was retained; duty was levied on beer, cider, perry, spirits and the Coffee House beverages of tea, coffee and chocolate. The rights to the revenue of excise were granted to the King (to cover the general expenses of government), in lieu of certain feudal dues and royal hereditary rights which had lately been abolished (such as those connected with purveyance and the Court of Wards and Liveries). For this purpose the revenue received was divided in two: 50% (termed the 'Hereditary Excise') was granted to the monarch and his heirs in perpetuity, the other 50% (termed the 'Temporary Excise') was granted to Charles II for life. (A similar arrangement remained in place in subsequent reigns until the establishment of the Civil List in 1760, since when monarchs have customarily ceded the Hereditary Excise and other hereditary revenues to Parliament at the time of their accession). 

From 1662 Excise revenue was farmed on and off (i.e. leased to speculators in return for an annual rent) until a Board Commissioners of Excise was established on a permanent footing in 1683. In addition to excise revenue, the Board and its officers were required to collect hearth money until the latter was abolished in 1689.

Following the Glorious Revolution of 1688, with the English Army expanding and fighting multiple campaigns, levels of duty were increased and new duties were raised: beer duty was doubled and over the next twenty-five years such diverse commodities as salt, glass, malt, candles, hops, leather, windows, wire, soap, paper and starch all became subject to excise duty. The distribution of Excise officers around the country meant that they were sometimes called upon to act for other branches of government; for example in 1693 they were called upon to provide annual statistics on inns and taverns to the Secretary at War (for the billeting of soldiers and the stabling of horses).

18th century

After the 1707 Act of Union a separate Excise Board was established for Scotland. When malt duty was imposed there in 1725 it caused widespread outcry and opposition. 

The Excise was now seen as an efficient and effective means of raising revenue and Robert Walpole (as Chancellor of the Exchequer and de facto Prime Minister) sought to make the most of it.  Seven years later he began to explore the possibility of using the Excise to counter problems of fraud and smuggling related to imported goods - particularly wine and tobacco - within the remit of HM Customs. When he presented his proposals to Parliament in 1733 it prompted a full-blown 'Excise Crisis': there was public frenzy, fuelled by fears that the Bill marked the first stage of a General Excise being imposed on all manner of domestic goods and other articles. When the Bill was withdrawn there were widespread celebrations.

In the wake of the crisis no new Excise duties were introduced for the next fifty years (except for a relatively short-lived duty on household plate). When, however, William Pitt the Younger arrived as Prime Minister, he brought with him a determination to raise revenue more effectively by way of the Excise service. A duty on bricks was introduced in 1784, as was the duty on Excise licences. Then, in 1786, Pitt revisited the proposals embodied in Walpole's withdrawn Excise Bill of 1733: the intention had been to reduce customs duty on imported wine and tobacco to a nominal amount and instead impose an Excise duty; on arrival, the goods would be placed directly in a bonded warehouse where they would remain under Excise control. Despite opposition from affected merchants and retailers, the Bill was passed. The gamble paid off and within a few years the duty on tobacco had established itself as Britain's most productive form of revenue (and it remained so until 1968). Thereafter, the developing war with France had prompted the introduction of new forms of duty and further increases.

In due course, the warehousing system proved advantageous to the traders since duty was only payable on the removal of goods from the warehouse. This enabled them to delay paying duty until the goods were sold (whereas previously Customs duty had to be paid the moment the goods arrived on dry land). In 1803 an Act was passed allowing the warehousing of all types of goods liable to Excise duty, and new warehouses were built in ports all round the country.

Smuggling remained a problem with which both Excise and Customs officers were now having to engage. As part of their response, both services were provided with revenue cutters (sea-going vessels to help them patrol the nation's coastal waters). The Excise Board had a fleet of seven cutters in operation by 1784; HM Customs had twenty vessels of its own and two dozen more under contract.

19th century
In 1823 the thitherto separate Boards of Commissioners for England, Scotland and Wales were consolidated into a single UK-wide Board of Excise.

During and after the Napoleonic Wars, the number and level of excise duties had continued to grow. From the 1820s, however, this trend began to be reversed; by 1840 the number of duties levied had reduced from twenty-seven to ten. Salt duty (levied since 1698) was repealed first, in 1825, followed by the long-standing excise duties on beer and cider (levied since 1643). Also in 1825 the somewhat anomalous situation whereby import duties (on coffee, cocoa, tobacco, wine and spirits) were collected by the Excise Office came to an end, with responsibility for these being handed back to HM Customs. (The Excise fleet of revenue cruisers were transferred over at the same time.)

In 1830, Sir Henry Parnell published an influential treatise On Financial Reform, which argued for the repeal of duties on the raw materials for building and manufacturing (including those on bricks, tiles, leather and hemp) in order to encourage manufacturing, the repeal of duties on items otherwise involved in manufacturing processes (including those on coal, glass, candles and soap) and the reduction of excise duty on wine and tobacco (in order to discourage smuggling); in order to counterbalance these proposed reductions Parnell argued for the (re-)introduction of taxes on property and on income (i.e. direct, rather than indirect, taxes).

The following year the duties on leather and on printed cotton were repealed, followed by that on candles. (The abolition of the latter was widely welcomed: chandlers' equipment was required to be kept secure behind a crown lock outside working hours, the key to which was held by the local excise officer, who was obliged during working hours to monitor the chandlers' work every four hours.) Where excise duties remained in place (e.g. on spirits, malt, soap and paper) the requirement for officers to monitor the manufacturing process was reduced.

Amalgamations

During the 1840s the Excise Office contracted as further duties were repealed (e.g. that on glass in 1845). Before long, plans were being drawn up to merge the much-reduced department with the Board of Stamps and Taxes (itself formed from a recent amalgamation). The merger was achieved after Parliament passed the Inland Revenue Board Act in January, 1849.

The reduction in excise duties continued post-amalgamation, with duties being repealed on bricks (1850), soap (1853) and paper (1861). In 1880 malt duty (which had been in place since 1697) followed suit; but it was replaced by a new excise duty on beer (which varied depending on the specific gravity of the product). In addition, the excise staff inherited responsibilities from other departments of the Revenue, such as railway passenger duty.

In the early 20th century a decision was taken to unite the two Boards responsible for indirect taxation; the Board of Customs and Excise was formed in 1909, leaving the Inland Revenue to administer direct taxes (principally income tax, which had been re-introduced in 1842).

Notes

References 

Taxation in the United Kingdom